Singer Bangladesh Ltd. (Bengali: সিঙ্গার বাংলাদেশ লিঃ) is a Bangladeshi sewing machine manufacturer company starting in the British Colonial era when Bangladesh was a part of the Indian subcontinent. Through a gradual growth now it is one of the manufacturers and distributors of consumer electronics alongside sewing machines.

History 
The first operation of Singer Bangladesh began in 1905. Later, in 1920, two shops were set up in Dhaka and Chittagong. In 1947, After the Partition  of the sub-continent and Bangladesh became East Pakistan. SINGER in East Pakistan operated as a branch of SINGER Pakistan and the products used to come from West Pakistan. Initially, only 10 shops were set up for operations, which raised to 43 by the late 1960s. After the Bangladesh Liberation War newly in emerged country Bangladesh Singer had to limit its operation to 23 stores and the branch office was promoted to country office. A change in the investment policy in 1979 created new business opportunities and SINGER registered as an operating company, A sewing machine manufacturing factory with 10000 unit per year capacity was established in 1980 in Chittagong. the capacity increased significantly to 25000 units per year in 1989. Although sewing machines are Singer's core business, management of Singer Bangladesh realized that for sustainable growth in the long run it has to diversify its Portfolio. this realization led to diversification into numerous ranges of products. In 1985, Singer began transformed from a single product into a multi-products consumer durable company for future growth and expansion. In 1993, the company established Its new audio video plant and In 1996 washing machine assembling section. later in 2001, the company initiated assembling of motor cycle and in 2006, manufacturing of various kinds of wires and cable (domestic and power cables)  in March 2019 Arçelik and Retail Holdings NV acquired Singer Bangladesh ltd. buying  57% of its shares

Corporate social responsibility 
As part of the 'Singer for Society' program, Singer Bangladesh Limited donated ventilators to three hospitals in and outside Dhaka for critical COVID-19 patients. Immediately after break out of COVID-19 in Bangladesh, they donated refrigerators, washing machines and microwave ovens to a number of hospitals across the country to facilitate safety of doctors and nurses, attending COVID-19 patients.

Reference 

Conglomerate companies of Bangladesh
Home appliance manufacturers of Bangladesh
Heating, ventilation, and air conditioning companies
Electronics companies of Bangladesh
Manufacturing companies based in Dhaka
Bangladeshi brands
Companies listed on the Dhaka Stock Exchange
Companies listed on the Chittagong Stock Exchange